Crimetime Saturday is the official branding for a programming block that started in 2004–05 on the American CBS and Canadian CTV networks Saturday nights. However, the branding is only listed by CBS and industry sources as a placeholder for the time slot, and not as an official on-air branding for the night.

The first two hours feature reruns of CBS's crime drama procedural series, which over the years have included the four series of the CSI franchise, Criminal Minds, NCIS, NCIS: Los Angeles, Cold Case, Flashpoint (before its move to Ion Television), The Mentalist, Blue Bloods and FBI, with the final hour featuring a new or encore edition of the CBS News newsmagazine program 48 Hours, which focuses on true crime stories. Several times a year 48 Hours will air two-hour specials or consecutive episodes.

Beginning in the 2011–2012 season, the block was reduced to two hours from three to make room for Comedytime Saturday, a one-hour sitcom block, from 8 to 9 p.m. ET/PT. However, that hour was restored to Crimetime for the 2012–2013 season due to that block never being executed as planned and becoming a basic hour of repeat sitcoms. In a few cases, burned off shows such as Made in Jersey have aired in the first or both hours to minimize ratings damage, along with a new episode of Vegas in mid-April 2013 pushed up by a night due to CBS News coverage of the apprehension of the Boston Marathon bombing suspect.

The Crimetime block was re-reduced to two hours of Saturday night for the 2013–2014 season with the return of Comedytime Saturday, but returned for the full three hours in the 2014–2015 season after a reduction of CBS's comedy schedule.

In the 2020–21 season and again in the 2021–22 season, Crimetime Saturday was reduced to 1 hour in June and July due to Superstar Racing Experience (only 48 Hours aired during that time frame) the only other interruption is burn offs and Love Island during that time frame.

CBS Television Network
Saturday mass media
Television programming blocks